Joshua Eilberg (February 12, 1921 – March 24, 2004) was a Democratic member of the U.S. House of Representatives from Pennsylvania.

Early life and education
Eilberg was born in Philadelphia, Pennsylvania.  He graduated from Central High School (Philadelphia), the Wharton School at the University of Pennsylvania and Temple University School of Law, both in Philadelphia, Pennsylvania.

Legal and early political career
He entered the United States Naval Reserve and became a private practice lawyer, later becoming assistant district attorney of the city of Philadelphia from 1952 to 1954. He was elected to the Pennsylvania State House of Representatives, serving from 1954 to 1966, rising to the position of majority leader in 1965–1966. He was a delegate to the Democratic National Conventions of 1960, 1964 and 1968, and was the Democratic ward leader for the fifty-fourth ward of Philadelphia.

Congress
He was elected in 1966 as a Democrat to the 90th and to the five succeeding Congresses.  In 1974, Eilberg defeated Chris Matthews, former host of MSNBC's Hardball with Chris Matthews, in the Democratic primary. In 1978, he defeated Mark B. Cohen in the Democratic primary, before losing to Charles F. Dougherty.  While in office, he served as the Chairman of the Judiciary Subcommittee on Immigration, Citizenship, and International Law. In that role, Representative Eilberg led a legislative veto to override the Attorney General's suspension of deportation of Jagdish Rai Chadha and five others under the Immigration and Nationality Act. The Supreme Court later found the legislative veto unconstitutional in INS v. Chadha, 462 U.S. 919 (1983).

Controversy, indictment and guilty plea
In 1978, then-U.S. Attorney David W. Marston investigated Eilberg for money he received in connection with a federal grant to Hahnemann University Hospital in Philadelphia.  Eilberg contacted the Carter White House, and Marston was later fired.  Eilberg lost his 1978 reelection bid, and, three months later, pleaded guilty to conflict of interest charges.  He was sentenced to five years of probation and a $10,000 fine.

Death
Eilberg died in Philadelphia on March 24, 2004, of complications of Parkinson’s Disease.

See also 
 List of American federal politicians convicted of crimes
 List of federal political scandals in the United States
 List of Jewish members of the United States Congress

Notes

References

1921 births
2004 deaths
20th-century American Jews
20th-century American lawyers
20th-century American politicians
21st-century American Jews
American government officials convicted of crimes
Central High School (Philadelphia) alumni
Democratic Party members of the United States House of Representatives from Pennsylvania
Jewish American military personnel
Jewish members of the United States House of Representatives
Democratic Party members of the Pennsylvania House of Representatives
Pennsylvania lawyers
Pennsylvania politicians convicted of crimes
Politicians from Philadelphia
Temple University Beasley School of Law alumni
United States Navy reservists
Wharton School of the University of Pennsylvania alumni